Gdje Dunav ljubi nebo (Where Danube kisses the sky) is song by Josipa Lisac. Originally performed at Yugoslav selection for Eurovision Song Contest 1987. Although the song lost to Novi fosili's Ja sam za ples, the song became a huge hit.

Composition 
Music was composed by Krešimir Klemenčić and lyrics were written by Alka Vujica. Programmers on this song were Klemenčić and Stanko Juzbašić.

References 

1987 songs
1980s songs